Lloyd Martin ( born 18 July 1958) is an Australian former professional rugby league footballer who played in the 1970s and 1980s. Martin played for Balmain and Canberra in the NSWRL competition. Martin was a foundation player for Canberra playing in the club's first ever game in 1982.

Playing career
Martin began his first grade career with Balmain in 1978. Martin joined the club at a time when its fortunes were down and the side struggled towards the bottom of the ladder.  Martin played up with Balmain until the end of the 1981 season which ended with the club finishing last and claiming the wooden spoon.

In 1982, Martin joined newly admitted Canberra and played in the club's first ever game, a 37–7 loss against the South Sydney Rabbitohs at Redfern Oval. Canberra would only go on to win 4 games in 1982 and suffered some heavy defeats throughout the season with the club ultimately finishing last on the table claiming the wooden spoon.

Martin played on with Canberra in 1983 but only managed 1 further appearance before departing the club.

In 1985, Martin joined the Bega Roosters in the NSW Country competition. Martin played with Bega until the end of 1989.  In his time there, Martin won 4 premierships with the club.

References

1955 births
Living people
Balmain Tigers players
Canberra Raiders players
Australian rugby league players
Rugby league five-eighths
Rugby league players from Sydney